The Barkley-Grow Aircraft Corporation was an American aircraft manufacturer established by Archiebald St Clair Barkley and Captain Harold Barkley Grow in Detroit in 1936 to produce a small civil transport which incorporated Barkley's patented wing design, the Barkley-Grow T8P-1.

History
Initially purchased by the General American Transportation Corporation in 1939, the company was bought by AVCO only a year later in 1940. Meanwhile, Roland A. Freeman the former chief of the experimental division, founded his own company in Santa Monica, California. The Barkley-Grow factory at the Detroit City Airport was seized by the city after a short dispute with Vultee, and turned into an aviation technical high school in 1943.

A Barkley-Grow seaplane went to Antarctica in 1939 on board the USS Bear to support the United States Antarctic Service Expedition under the supervision of Rear Admiral Richard E. Byrd.

Aircraft

References

Notes

Bibliography

 
 
 

Defunct aircraft manufacturers of the United States
Defunct manufacturing companies based in Michigan